AnnaSofia Mååg (born 1968) is a Swedish ice artist, sculptor and ceramicist.

Life
She has a Master of Fine Arts from HDK – School of Design and Crafts of the University of Gothenburg.

She has created works for the Icehotel in Jukkasjärvi since 2006. In 2014 she worked with Alessandro Falca to make a "Secret Garden" in the main hall, including a wishing well and unicorn.

One of her ceramic works, made in 2001, is held by the Swedish Nationalmuseum in Stockholm. She has exhibited sculpture at the Svalöv International Sculpture Symposium.

References

External links

1968 births
Living people
University of Gothenburg alumni
Swedish women sculptors
Swedish sculptors
21st-century Swedish women artists
21st-century Swedish artists